Pyriproboscis is a genus of small parasitic spiny-headed (or thorny-headed) worms. It is the only genus in the family Pyriprobosicidae.

Species
There is one genus and one species in the family Pyriprobosicidae.

Pyriproboscis Amin, Abdullah & Mhaisen, 2003
Pyriproboscis heronensis (Pichelin, 1997)

Notes

References

Polymorphida
Acanthocephala genera